Stanley Adair Cain (19 June 1902, Deputy, Indiana – 1 April 1995, Santa Cruz, California) was a botanist and pioneer of plant ecology and environmental studies.

Biography
Cain graduated from Butler University with B.S. in 1924 and from the University of Chicago with M.S. in 1927 and with Ph.D. in 1930. His doctoral dissertation on the heath balds of the Great Smoky Mountains was based upon field work in 1929 and 1930. His doctoral advisor was George D. Fuller (1869–1961). At Butler University's department of botany, Cain was an instructor from 1924 to 1927, an assistant professor from 1927 to 1930, and an associate professor from 1930 to 1931. At Indiana University, he was an assistant professor of botany from 1931 to 1933 and a research associate in the Waterman Institute from 1933 to 1935. Cain was a plant sociologist, during the summers from 1935 to 1938 at Cold Spring Harbor Laboratory. He was an associate professor from 1935 to 1946 at the University of Tennessee. There he had a year's leave of absence as a Guggenheim Fellow for the academic year 1940–1941 when he worked on his treatise Foundations of Plant Geography. In 1945 Cain was a lieutenant colonel in the U.S. Army and served as chief of the scientific section of the American Army University in Biarritz in the French Basque Country.

From 1946 to 1950 Cain was a research associate at the Cranbrook Institute of Science in Bloomfield Hills, Michigan. In 1950 Samuel Trask Dana appointed him to the Charles Lathrop Pack Professorship of Conservation in the University of Michigan's School of Natural Resources. Cain established the Department of Conversation in the School of Natural Resources and served as the Department's chair from 1950 to 1961. In 1950 he was simultaneously appointed a full professor in the University of Michigan's Department of Botany. For the academic year 1955–1956 he was a member of the U.N. Technical Assistance Mission to Brazil, where he collaborated with Dr. G. M. de Oliveira Castro, a specialist in tropical medicine, in preparing their Manual of Vegetation Analysis (1959). The purpose of the U.N. Mission was to study rainforest vegetation in order to provide information for mosquito control in Brazil's efforts to prevent malaria. From 1965 to 1968 Cain was on leave of absence so that he could serve as Assistant Secretary of the Interior in the Johnson Administration. At the University of Michigan he resumed his academic duties in 1968 and retired in 1972. After retiring from the University of University of Michigan, he became an adjunct professor at the University of Santa Cruz.

He was the author or co-author of over 100 articles in scientific journals, including Botanical Gazette, Ecological Monographs, American Midland Naturalist, Ecology, The Bryologist, Castanea, and American Journal of Botany. He contributed the article Archidiaceae to Grout's Moss flora of North America, north of Mexico, vol. 1 (1928).

In 1940 Cain married Louise Gilbert (1911–1993). Cain, an experienced administrator, worked with Jean Campbell and Jane Likert to create the University of Michigan's Center for Continuing Education of Women. Their son Stephen Cain had a long, distinguished career as an newspaper reporter and editor in Michigan.

Awards and honors
 1940 — Guggenheim Fellow
 1958 — president of the Ecological Society of America
 1959 — honorary doctorate, University of Montreal 
 1965 — Michigan Conservationist of the Year
 1969 — Eminent Ecologist Award, Ecological Society of America
 1970 — member of the National Academy of Sciences

Eponyms
 Calamagrostis cainii named by A. S. Hitchcock in 1934, based upon a specimen collected by Cain

References

External links

1902 births
1995 deaths
20th-century American botanists
Plant ecologists
Butler University alumni
University of Chicago alumni
Butler University faculty
University of Tennessee faculty
University of Michigan faculty
Members of the United States National Academy of Sciences
People from Jefferson County, Indiana